Tsai Eng-meng (born 1957)is a major shareholder of several traditional media. He is a businessman lives in Taiwan, also a chairman of the snack food company Want Want China.  He was the richest person in Taiwan in 2017.

Early life
Tsai was born in 1957, in Datong District, Taipei, the son of Tsai A-Shi, who founded a canned fish business in 1962.

Career
Tsai succeeded his father as chairman of Want Want in 1987.

According to Forbes, Tsai Eng-meng has a net worth of $5.9 billion, as of January 2017.

For a non-politician, he has been extremely active politically. He strongly supports the unification of Taiwan and China. In 2012 he said that "unification will happen sooner or later."

Personal life
He lives in Shanghai, China. His older son, Kevin Tsai runs the family's media empire of TV stations and newspapers. His younger son Matthew Tsai (Tsai Wang-Chia, born 1984) is the chief operating officer of Want Want China. He is a follower of Buddhism.

References

1957 births
Living people
Businesspeople from Taipei
Taiwanese billionaires
Taiwanese Buddhists